Jephté Bastien is a Canadian film director. His debut film, Sortie 67, won the Claude Jutra Award for best feature film by a first-time film director at the 31st Genie Awards in 2011.

Born in Haiti, Bastien is based in Montreal.

References

Living people
Best First Feature Genie and Canadian Screen Award winners
Haitian emigrants to Canada
Film directors from Montreal
Haitian Quebecers
Black Canadian filmmakers
Year of birth missing (living people)